Albert Gamse (1901 – 1974) was an American lyricist.

Gamse wrote lyrics for the Presidential Anthem of the United States, "Hail to the Chief".

Notable songs
"Amapola"
"Miami Beach Rhumba" (with Irving Fields)
"Chantez, Chantez" (with Irving Fields)
"Managua, Nicaragua" (with Irving Fields)

References

1901 births
1974 deaths
American lyricists
Place of birth missing